This list of most-downloaded Google Play applications includes most of the free apps that have been downloaded more than 500 million times, and most of the paid apps that have been downloaded more than one million times on unique Android devices. There are numerous Android apps that have been downloaded more than one million times from the Google Play app store, and it was reported in July 2017 that there are 319 apps which have been downloaded at least 100 million times and 4,098 apps have been downloaded at least ten million times. The barrier for entry on this list is set at 500 million for free apps to limit the size of this list. Many of the applications in this list are distributed pre-installed on top-selling Android devices and may be considered bloatware by some people because users did not actively choose to download them. The table below shows the number of Google Play apps in each category.

Free apps
These lists are of the apps in Google Play that are free, and have at least 500 million downloads on unique Android devices:

Key

More than 10 billion downloads
These are the Google Play apps with more than ten billion downloads on unique devices:

More than 5 billion downloads
These are the Google Play apps with more than five billion downloads, but less than ten billion downloads on unique devices:

More than 1 billion downloads
These are the Google Play apps with more than ten billion downloads, but less than five billion downloads on unique devices:

More than 500 million downloads
This is the list of the Google Play apps with more than 500 million, and less than one billion downloads on unique devices:

Paid apps
This is the list of those apps in Google Play which are paid, and have at least 1 million downloads on unique Android Devices:

More than 10 million downloads
This is the list of the Google Play paid apps with more than ten million or more downloads on unique devices:

More than 5 million downloads
This is the list of the Google Play paid apps with more than 5 million and less than ten million downloads on unique devices:

More than 1 million downloads
This is the list of the Google Play paid apps with more than 1 million and less than five million downloads on unique devices:

Notes

References

 
Google lists
Lists of mobile apps